WBBZ can refer to:

WBBZ (AM), a radio station located in Ponca City, Oklahoma
WBBZ-TV (formerly WNGS), a television station located in Springville, New York